The Russian Women's Cup (Russian: КУБОК РОССИИ) is the national women's football cup competition in Russia. The first edition of the cup was played out in 1992.

List of finals
The list of finals:

 Match awarded

See also
Russian Cup, men's edition

References

External links
Cup at women.soccerway.com

 
Women
Recurring sporting events established in 1992
Women's football competitions in Russia
Rus
Professional sports leagues in Russia